Yılanlı Ada (literally "the island with snakes") is a small Mediterranean island in Turkey.

The Aydıncık Islands are nearby.

The uninhabited island was known as "Spurie" during antiquity.
 The area around the island was declared an archaeological site. During recent exploration many anchors were found around the island, indicating that it was a popular anchorage area from the Bronze Age. Also a wreck with amphorae LP1 type from the Roman Empire was found. Two amphorae, three stone anchors, a lead stock and its collar, and a stone stock were delivered to the Silifke Museum.

References

Islands of Turkey
Islands of Mersin Province
Aydıncık District (Mersin)
Mediterranean islands